The Gold Coast Indy 300 was an annual open-wheel motor race event that took place at the Surfers Paradise Street Circuit on the Gold Coast, Queensland, Australia from 1991 to 2008. The challenging  track, alongside a strip of beaches, had several fast sections and four chicanes. The event had various names during its history for sponsorship reasons; in its final year, it was known as the Nikon Indy 300.

The race debuted in 1991 on the CART Indy Car World Series calendar, the first race in series history held outside North America. Following the split between CART and the newly formed Indy Racing League (IRL) in 1996, CART continued to sanction the event until it folded after the 2003 season. From 2004 to 2007, the race was part of the Champ Car World Series, a successor to CART. Following the merger of the Indy Racing League and Champ Car World Series in February 2008 it was announced that the race would continue as an IndyCar Series event; however the race was omitted from the 2009 IndyCar Series season calendar, and subsequently dropped by the IndyCar Series completely.

In 2009 as part of the Q150 celebrations, the Gold Coast Indy 300 was announced as one of the Q150 Icons of Queensland for its role as an "event and festival".

History

Early years

The event arrived in Australia on the back of lobbying from a consortium of businessmen from the state of Queensland. The event's early years were dogged by controversy as Australia's motor sport governing body, the Confederation of Australian Motor Sport (CAMS), initially refused to sanction the event. The Queensland State Government had been largely supportive of the event, whereas support at local level from the Gold Coast City Council varied, and was occasionally openly hostile to the event.

From 1991 to 1997, the Gold Coast Grand Prix was typically held in March, and several times served as the CART season opener. In 1996, the Australian Grand Prix (Melbourne) moved from the fall to the spring. It created an undesirable scheduling conflict which eventually saw the Gold Coast Indy move permanently to October, starting in 1998. By the late 1990s, as political tensions subsided, the race become a well-attended and popular event on the Gold Coast calendar with tens of thousands of spectators attending each of the four days of the event.

The 1993 race was particularly notable as 1992 Formula One champion Nigel Mansell's first race in American championship car racing, which he won in front of a large number of travelling British fans and media. It was also the first of a record seven race wins at the event for Newman/Haas Racing. In the 2002 event there was a frightening incident when a nine-car pile-up occurred at the start in very wet conditions, however no significant injuries were sustained. In 2003 a massive thunderstorm struck the area during the race, leading to a red flag and shortened race distance.

Decline

The event lost some of its lustre from 2004, as the split between American open wheel racing series started to draw teams from the Champ Car World Series across to the IRL IndyCar Series, whose calendar was considerably more domestic than the well-travelled Champ Car World Series. The falling popularity of open wheel racing in America further devalued the event, with NASCAR dominating the U.S. racing scene. The waning interest led to the V8 Supercars (the leading touring cars category in Australia and a support category since 1994) move from a non-championship to championship event in 2002 and take equal top billing with Champ Car, an unprecedented move across the Champ Car calendar. Traditionally the CART/Champ Car race was the final event of the programme, but in later years the final V8 Supercars race held this place.

In the first sixteen years of the event, there were sixteen different winners.  In 2007 Sébastien Bourdais became the first driver to win the race twice, adding to his 2005 victory.

Merger

On 5 March 2008, it was announced that the IndyCar Series would travel to Australia for the first time, but due to contractual issues the race would not count towards the 2008 championship and would be a stand-alone demonstration event, in light of the recent merger between Champ Car and the IRL. Australian driver Ryan Briscoe nonetheless became the first local winner of the event, in what remains the final running of the event to date.

Demise and A1GP

On 11 November 2008, after extensive negotiations with the IndyCar Series broke down, the Queensland Government reached a new five-year deal with A1 Grand Prix to stage a race at Surfers Paradise, severing its eighteen-year history with American open wheel racing. On 25 February 2009 it was announced that the event, which would combine one of the first few rounds of the 2009–10 A1 Grand Prix season and the 11th round of the 2009 V8 Supercar Championship Series, would be produced through a partnership between IMG and the Queensland Government. The event was also renamed as the SuperGP for 2009, with the iconic Indy name becoming obsolete.

However, on 17 October 2009, A1GP Chairman Tony Teixeira announced that the United Kingdom operating arm of the series went into liquidation in June, with access to the A1GP cars and their ability to pay its suppliers having been impeded. That prevented the cars from leaving Europe in time to be on track in Surfers Paradise on 22 October. Therefore, A1GP withdrew from participation in the 2009 Nikon SuperGP, with V8 Supercars instead running additional races. A1GP refunded Gold Coast Motor Events Co. the sanction fee paid, and donated A$50,000 to a charity designated by the board.

Following A1GP's withdrawal, V8 Supercars became the permanent and sole lead category of the event, which became known as the Gold Coast 600 as of 2010. This event continues to the current day, albeit on a shorter 2.96 km version of the original Surfers Paradise circuit. The original longer circuit has also now been rendered unusable by the G:link light rail network, which now extends along Surfers Paradise Boulevard beyond the existing second chicane.

Future
In June 2016 the Gold Coast Bulletin reported that "secret government talks" were underway to bring back the IndyCar race for 2017 or 2018, and that an area consortium had been given rights to negotiate with IndyCar for an Australian race with a preference for the Gold Coast. IndyCar management would not comment other than to say they were investigating potential overseas venues. With Supercars later signing an extension of their exclusive deal for the event from 2017 to 2019, combined with the prohibitive shorter track layout, and costs of bringing the series to Australia, there are several barriers preventing the revival of the event.

Past winners
Events which were not championship rounds are indicated by a pink background.

Notes:
 – 1994: Race shortened due to darkness.
 – 2000: Race shortened due to time limit.
 – 2002: Race shortened due to rain.
 – 2003: Race shortened from 65 laps.

Event names
 1991: Gold Coast IndyCar GP
 1992: Daikyo IndyCar GP
 1993–94: Australian FAI IndyCar GP
 1995: IndyCar Australia
 1996: Bartercard IndyCar Australia
 1997: Sunbelt IndyCarnival
 1998–2002: Honda Indy 300
 2003–07: Lexmark Indy 300
 2008: Nikon Indy 300

See also
 1954 Australian Grand Prix
 V8 Supercar Challenge
 Gold Coast 600

References

External links
Official Event Site

 
Recurring sporting events established in 1991
Sport on the Gold Coast, Queensland
Culture of Gold Coast, Queensland